The Danger Game may refer to:

 The Danger Game (film), a 1918 American silent film, directed by Snub Pollard
 A 2011 novel written by Kalinda Ashton